Julissa Bermúdez (born September 28, 1983) is an American television host, actress, dancer, and model. She was a co-host on BET's most popular music video countdown show 106 & Park from 2005 until 2006, and the former host of Jersey Shore: After Hours and related Jersey Shore specials and reunions for earlier seasons. She co-starred alongside recording artist and actress Adrienne Bailon in their own reality series, Empire Girls: Julissa and Adrienne which aired on the former Style Network.

Early life
Bermudez was born in Santo Domingo, Dominican Republic and raised in Elmhurst, Queens, New York.

Career
While attending New York's Talent Unlimited High School as a theatre major, Bermudez started auditioning and modeling. She got her first big break with a Coca-Cola commercial, and she was one of the six finalists who competed to represent singer Jennifer Lopez's sweetface fashion line.

She co-hosted the entertainment news show "Central Ave" from 2020-2021.

Filmography

See also

Lists of people from the Dominican Republic

References

External links

Profile from Dominican Film Festival

American film actresses
American people of Dominican Republic descent
Hispanic and Latino American actresses
Dominican Republic emigrants to the United States
American television actresses
Actresses from New York City
1983 births
Living people
21st-century American actresses
People from Elmhurst, Queens
Participants in American reality television series